Endoclita gmelina is a species of moth of the family Hepialidae. It is known from Myanmar. Food plants for this species include Gmelina and Tectona.

References

External links
Hepialidae genera

Moths described in 1941
Hepialidae